On My Skin (also known as Upon My Skin) is a  2003 Italian crime-drama film written and directed by Valerio Jalongo. It was screened in competition at the 2003 Turin Film Festival.

Plot

Cast 

Ivan Franek as Tony 
Donatella Finocchiaro as Bianca 
Vincenzo Peluso as  Alfonso 
 Mario Scarpetta as  Cesare Boccia 
 Stefano Cassetti as  Sauro

See also   
 List of Italian films of 2003

References

External links

2003 films
Italian crime drama films
2003 crime drama films
2000s Italian films